The Ratak Chain (Marshallese:) is a chain of islands within the island nation of the Marshall Islands.  Ratak means "sunrise".  It lies to the east of the country's other island chain, the Ralik Chain.  In 1999 the total population of the Ratak islands was 30,925.

The atolls and isolated islands in the chain are:

 Ailuk Atoll
 Arno Atoll
 Aur Atoll
 Bikar Atoll
 Bokak Atoll
 Erikub Atoll
 Jemo Island
 Knox Atoll
 Likiep Atoll
 Majuro Atoll
 Maloelap Atoll
 Mejit Island
 Mili Atoll
 Taka Atoll
 Utirik Atoll
 Wotje Atoll

The Ratak Chain forms a continuous chain of seamounts with the Gilbert Islands to the south, which are part of Kiribati.

Language

The Ratak Chain is home to the Ratak dialect (or eastern dialect) of the Marshallese language.  It is mutually intelligible with the Rālik dialect (or western dialect) located on the Rālik Chain.  The two dialects differ mainly in lexicon and in certain regular phonological reflexes.

References

 
 Ratak Chain
Archipelagoes of the Pacific Ocean